Tetracis hirsutaria is a moth of the family Geometridae first described by William Barnes and James Halliday McDunnough in 1913. It is found in the United States in California and extreme southern Nevada.

The length of the forewings 17–23 mm. Adults are on wing from early October to November.

Larvae have been reared on Ceanothus (including Ceanothus cuneatus), Cercocarpus, (including Cercocarpus betuloides), Prunus emarginata and Ribes malvaceum.

External links
Revision of the North American genera Tetracis Guenée and synonymization of Synaxis Hulst with descriptions of three new species (Lepidoptera: Geometridae: Ennominae)

H
Moths of North America
Fauna of the California chaparral and woodlands
Fauna of the Mojave Desert
Taxa named by William Barnes (entomologist)
Taxa named by James Halliday McDunnough
Moths described in 1913